Radical 84 or radical steam meaning "steam", "air" or "breath" is one of the 34 Kangxi radicals (214 radicals in total) composed of 4 strokes.

In the Kangxi Dictionary, there are 17 characters (out of 49,030) to be found under this radical.

 is also the 81st indexing component in the Table of Indexing Chinese Character Components predominantly adopted by Simplified Chinese dictionaries published in mainland China.

Evolution

Derived characters

In modern Chinese, this radical is used to form characters representing gaseous chemical elements and compounds.

Literature

External links

Unihan Database - U+6C14

084
081